Shhh is a Maldivian horror web television series developed for Baiskoafu by Amjad Ibrahim. It revolves around the haunting of a newly married couple. The series is produced by Hussain Munawwar, Abdulla Hafiz and Mohamed Mirusam.

The series stars Ahmed Azmeel, Sheela Najeeb, Zeenath Abbas, Ahmed Shaaz, Irufana Ibrahim and Mariyam Haleem pivotal roles. The first episode of the series was released on Baiskoafu on 10 May 2019.

Cast and characters
 Ahmed Azmeel as Sunil (5 episodes)
 Sheela Najeeb as Ram (2 episodes)
 Zeenath Abbas as Reesha (2 episodes)
 Ahmed Shaaz as Alifulhube (5 episodes)
 Irufana Ibrahim as Lucian (1 episode)
 Mariyam Haleem as Lucian's mother (2 episodes)
 Ali Nadheeh as Sunil's friend (1 episode)

Episodes

Development
In April 2019, it was announced that Baiskoafu has collaborated with Amjad Ibrahim for a horror web series starring Sheela Najeeb, Ahmed Azmeel, Zeenath Abbas and Irufana Ibrahim. Entire series was filmed in Hulhumale. In an interview, talking about his first web series, Amjad Ibrahim stated; "considering the advancement in technology, this series is created for the digital audience and we have created never-seen-before horror scenes in this series thanks the young intellect in our crew".

Release
The first episode among the five episodes from the first season was released on 10 May 2019, on the occasion of 1440 Ramadan. Director Amjad Ibrahim revealed his intention of renewing the series for a second season based on its popularity. A new episode is scheduled to release on Friday 21:00 of every week.

References

Serial drama television series
Maldivian web series